St. Ignatius of Loyola College is a private Catholic primary and secondary school with middle school technical training, located on Las Palmas, in Gran Canaria, in the autonomous community of the Canary Islands, Spain. The school was founded by the Society of Jesus in 1917, and has grown to cover infant through baccalaureate and middle technical training.

The school is located in the old part of the city. It accommodates from first year of infant education through baccalaureate and professional training of middle degree.

See also

 Catholic Church in Spain
 Education in Spain
 List of Jesuit schools

References  

Jesuit secondary schools in Spain
Jesuit primary schools in Spain
Schools in Las Palmas
Educational institutions established in 1917
1917 establishments in Spain